SimPy is a process-based discrete-event simulation framework based on standard Python. SimPy is released as open source software under the MIT License. The first version was released in December 2002. 

Its event dispatcher is based on Python's generators and can also be used for asynchronous networking or to implement multi-agent systems (with both, simulated and real communication). Simulations can be performed “as fast as possible”, in real time (wall clock time) or by manually stepping through the events.Though it is theoretically possible to do continuous simulations with SimPy, it has no features to carry out that. However, SimPy is overkill for simulations with a fixed step size where your processes don't interact with each other or with shared resources — use a simple while loop in this case.

Processes in SimPy are simple Python generator functions and are used to model active components like customers, vehicles or agents. SimPy also provides various types of shared resources to model limited capacity congestion points (like servers, checkout counters and tunnels). From version 3.1, it will also provide monitoring capabilities to aid in gathering statistics about resources and processes.

Simpy 3.0 requires Python 3. , while Simpy 4.0 requires Python 3.6+. SimPy distribution contains tutorials, documentation, and examples.

Example 

The following is a SimPy simulation  showing a clock process that prints the current simulation time at each step:
>>> import simpy
>>>
>>> def clock(env, name, tick):
...     while True:
...         print(name, env.now)
...         yield env.timeout(tick)
...
>>> env = simpy.Environment()
>>> env.process(clock(env, 'fast', 0.5))
<Process(clock) object at 0x...>
>>> env.process(clock(env, 'slow', 1))
<Process(clock) object at 0x...>
>>> env.run(until=2)
fast 0
slow 0 
fast 0.5 
slow 1 
fast 1.0 
fast 1.5

References

Cross-platform software
Free science software
Python (programming language) libraries
Simulation programming languages
Articles with example Python (programming language) code